Löwenbräukeller is a beer hall and event center located in Maxvorstadt, Munich, Bavaria, Germany. It has hosted concerts by artists such as Def Leppard, Ozzy Osbourne and Kiss.

It was used as a substitute site for the anniversaries of the 1923 Beer Hall Putsch, after a 1939 assassination attempt on Adolf Hitler by Georg Elser rendered the original site, the nearby Bürgerbräukeller unusable.

References

Buildings and structures in Munich
Music venues in Munich
Maxvorstadt